Associated Studios is a drama school in London, offering courses in acting, musical theatre, opera and commercial/popular music.

Associated Studios were founded by Leontine Hass in 2007, then based at the Royal Academy of Music, in order to address a lack of top-level ongoing professional development and training for performers. In addition to regular classes and masterclasses in acting, singing and dance, Associated Studios also runs Professional Development Workshops for performers who are already working. Associated Studios is the only Performing Arts Academy in the UK to offer training for performers starting a career as well as industry professionals looking for ongoing professional development. On graduation students are eligible for entry into Spotlight, the leading industry casting directory.

Premises
In 2019 the school relocated to a 3 floored building in Kensington and Chelsea.

Musical theatre courses
The first one-year full-time Musical Theatre course started in September 2016. Other shorter, part-time courses are also offered throughout the school's academic year which are essentially only specific portions of the same full-time course. This involves such part-time students joining the full-time course at different times of the year for a shorter period and generally sharing the same classes as full-time students.

In 2020 an MA in Musical Theatre Performance course was introduced validated by the University of Wolverhampton. The course is aimed at performers with the potential to train for a career in Musical Theatre and offers a year of intensive, practical training in dance, singing and acting.

In August 2020 it was announced that patron Jeremy Irons was gifting a bursary for a talented performer to study on the one year Diploma in Musical Theatre course.

Key personnel
Leontine Hass - Founding principal/director
Joshua Yeardley - Office manager
Scott Harrison - Senior musical theatre consultant
Kathy Taylor-Jones - Singing tutor

Patrons

Sir Tim Rice
Jeremy Irons
Rory Bremner
Timothy West
Jeremy Herrin

Alumni
Jamie Lambert - Collabro (Winner of Britain's Got Talent 2014)
Alice Stokke - Sophie in Mama Mia! (West End: Novello Theatre)

References

Educational institutions established in 2007
Performing arts education in London
Drama schools in London
2007 establishments in England